The Panismahas or Panimaha were a sub-group of the  Pawnee.  They mainly appear in the 18th century, and how they connect with later 19th century groups is somewhat unclear.  They may have been somehow connected with the Skidi sub-group of the Pawnee, but this is not certain.

In the 1700s, they lived west of the Missouri River in present-day Nebraska. A 1718 French map locates les Panimaha in the vicinity of the Riv. des Panis (Platte River) with other Pawnee villages (les Panis), perhaps on the Loup River, a historic territory of the Skidi. In the fall of 1724, in a village of the Kansa people, the Panismahas joined a peace council with Frenchmen, Otoes, Osages, Iowa, Missouri and Illini. In about 1752 they made peace with the Comanches (les Padoucas), Wichitas and the main Pawnee groups.

One group of these people, who may have been specifically part of the Skidi tribe, moved from what is now Nebraska to the Texas-Arkansas border regions where they lived with the Taovayas.  It appears that this group was also the Pannis designated in a village along the Sulphur Creek in northeast Texas in a 19th-century Spanish map.

See also
Panis (slaves of First Nation descent)

Sources
John, Elizabeth. Storms Brewed in Other Men's Worlds. College Station: Texas A&M University Press.
article on Nebraska inhabitants in 18th century

Native American tribes in Nebraska
Native American tribes in Texas
Pawnee